Bouquet of Roses is an album by Les Paul and Mary Ford, released in 1962.

Track listing
"I Love You So Much It Hurts Me"
"You Win Again"
"Four Walls"
"I Hang My Head and Cry"
"Someday (You'll Want Me to Want You)"
"I'll Never Be Free" (Bennie Benjamin/George Weiss)
"I Gotta Have My Baby Back"
"I'm Thinking Tonight of My Blue Eyes"
"End of the World"
"You're Free to Go"
"Bouquet of Roses"
"She'll Have to Go"

1962 albums
Columbia Records albums
Les Paul albums
Mary Ford albums